Blur Studio is an American-based production company which specialises in CGI visual effects, CGI animation and CGI design. Located in Culver City, California, the studio has produced CGI-animated films, teasers and ad spots for television, as well as video-game CGI cinematics.

History
Founded in September 1994 by David Stinnett, Tim Miller, Cat Chapman and Al Shier, Blur has worked on numerous projects earning critical acclaim . Sometime in the early 2000s, the studio took interest in the Bionicle toyline by The Lego Group and came up with an idea for a Bionicle film, and a short test pitch was created, under the title "Tahu Nuva vs Kohrak". The project did not manage to be green light by Lego, however a direct-to-video film was eventually made in 2003. The final animation for the film was eventually handled by Creative Capers Entertainment.

The studio worked on the 2004 short film Gopher Broke which was nominated for 2004 Academy Award for Best Animated Short Film.

In 2009, they assisted with the creation of CGI environments in the Academy Award-winning film Avatar.

In 2011, Blur created the opening title sequence for The Girl with the Dragon Tattoo, based on the first book of Stieg Larsson's Millennium Trilogy and directed by David Fincher.

They created the "Heaven and Hell" sequence for South Park: Bigger, Longer & Uncut.

Blur Studio produced a cinematic trailer for the video game PlanetSide 2 titled "Death is No Excuse." They were also responsible for the cinematic trailers of Batman: Arkham City, Batman: Arkham Origins and Batman: Arkham Knight. They remade the Halo 2 cutscenes for Halo: The Master Chief Collection (2014) and produced the cutscenes for Halo Wars 2 (2017) after doing so for Halo Wars (2009).

In 2016, Miller and the studio returned to the Sonic the Hedgehog franchise and were involved with the film adaptation of the series which was in development at Sony Pictures until they put the project into turnaround and sold the rights to Paramount Pictures in 2017. The film was released in February 14, 2020 in collaboration with Sega and their animation studio, Marza Animation Planet, and Original Film. A sequel was released on April 8, 2022.

In 2017, Blur created another opening title sequence for the Netflix psychological thriller, Mindhunter based on the 1995 true-crime book, Mindhunter: Inside the FBI's Elite Serial Crime Unit by John E. Douglas and Mark Olshaker, produced and directed by David Fincher.

In 2019, the studio produced the animation for the Netflix anthology series Love, Death & Robots, created by Tim Miller, and also produced the second volume of the series. On May 16, 2019, it was announced that Blur Studio's film The Goon, based on the 1999 comic of the same name by Eric Powell, secured a distribution deal with 20th Century Fox and Chernin Entertainment.

Works

Film and television

Games

Rides

Links
 
 Blur Studio API's, Libraries and Tools (blur-dev)
 Making of Warhammer Online: Age of Reckoning Trailer at Gnomon Events

References

American animation studios
Mass media companies established in 1994
Visual effects companies
1994 establishments in California
Companies based in Culver City, California